is the 18th single by Japanese idol duo Wink. Written by Chinfa Kan and Satoshi Kadokura, the single was released on May 26, 1993, by Polystar Records.

Background and release 
"Kekkon Shiyoune" was used as the second ending theme of the Fuji TV anime series . The B-side, "Maboroshi ga Sakenderu" was used by T&E Soft for commercials promoting the Super Famicom game Sword World SFC.

"Kekkon Shiyoune" peaked at No. 15 on the Oricon's weekly charts and sold over 75,000 copies.

Track listing

Chart positions 
Weekly charts

Year-end charts

References

External links 
 
 

1993 singles
1993 songs
Wink (duo) songs
Japanese-language songs
Anime songs
Songs with lyrics by Chinfa Kan